The Sixth Doctor Adventures is a Big Finish Productions audio play series based on the television series Doctor Who. It sees the return of Colin Baker reprising his role as the Sixth Doctor.

History
In 1999, beginning with the story The Sirens of Time, Big Finish Productions began producing a series of audio adventures featuring the Fifth Doctor, Sixth Doctor and Seventh Doctor. For 22 years these stories continued collectively known as Big Finish's Main Range. In May 2020, Big Finish announced the main range would conclude in March 2021 and subsequently replaced with regular releases of each Doctor's adventures continuing in their own respective ranges. Several previously released special titles were retroactively reallocated into these new ranges by Big Finish.

Cast and characters

Notable Guests

 Sylvester McCoy as The Doctor
 Chris Finney as Keith Potter
 Nicholas Briggs as the Cybermen and the Krotons
 Trevor Baxter as Professor George Litefoot
 Christopher Benjamin as Henry Gordon Jago
 Cherylee Houston as Elise

Episodes

Specials

The Sixth Doctor: The Last Adventure (2015)

The Sixth Doctor and Peri (2020)

The Eleven (2021)

Water Worlds (2022)

Purity Undreamed (2022)

Purity Unleashed

The Sixth Doctor Adventures 2023B 
The second is scheduled for August 2023.

References

Audio plays based on Doctor Who
Big Finish Productions
Doctor Who spin-offs
Sixth Doctor audio plays